Quin Walton Houff (born September 15, 1997) is an American professional stock car racing driver.

Racing career

Early years
Houff started to race when he was eight, driving go-karts. A year later, he upgraded to Mini-Cup cars and by age thirteen, he was racing Limited Late Model cars at local tracks. During his formative years, Houff often competed at legendary short track South Boston Speedway.

Late models
Houff ran the entire 2015 CARS Super Late Model Series schedule at age seventeen. He won one race, in Hudson, North Carolina, recorded four more top fives and finished fourth in points. On the strength of that season, Houff was named to the 2016 Kulwicki Driver Development program. He won the 2016 CARS season opener, but ran only the first seven races, a move he made after consulting with a strategy team. He also ran the 2016 All American 400 for David Gilliland. Houff returned to the series on a limited basis in 2017. After not racing since the 2021 Cup Series Finale at Phoenix, Houff will attempt to run South Boston Speedway's Crown Jewel race and the first race of the Virginia Triple Crown, the Thunder Road Harley-Davidson 200.

ARCA Racing Series
Houff teamed up with Mason Mitchell and his team to run the opening race of the 2017 ARCA Racing Series after a test at Daytona International Speedway. After leading laps and earning an award for leading at halfway, he was caught up in a wreck.

On January 8, 2018, Houff and Mason Mitchell Motorsports announced that they would run at least four races together in 2018, at Daytona, Pocono Raceway, Michigan International Speedway and Charlotte Motor Speedway. He will work together with Mark Setzer, his crew chief from his Xfinity Series races.

Xfinity Series

On March 21, 2017, it was announced that Houff would drive two NASCAR Xfinity Series races for Precision Performance Motorsports, at Bristol Motor Speedway and Richmond International Raceway. He tested for the races at Motor Mile Speedway. At Bristol, Houff hovered around the top ten most of the day after a strong qualifying run but damage due to an incident with Ross Chastain dropped him to fifteenth. After the race at Richmond, Houff signed on for two more races with the team, at Iowa Speedway and Kentucky Speedway. He took advantage of good pit strategy at Iowa to score a career-best twelfth but spun during his qualifying lap at Kentucky and failed to qualify. He made starts at Kentucky and Kansas, finishing in the mid-20s. He failed to qualify for his final scheduled start of the year, at Homestead.

Houff was left without a ride as PPM shuttered its team at the end of the 2017 season.

On September 7, 2018, it was announced that Houff would make his 2018 Xfinity debut with JD Motorsports' No. 4 entry at Richmond. After finishing 31st in a one-off for the team, a deal came together on October 18, 2018 for Houff to run the final four races of the Xfinity Series season in the organization's No. 15 entry. The deal was made quickly, with Houff finalizing the deal and traveling to Kansas Speedway for the first race of the agreement on the same day.

Cup Series

On January 22, 2019, Spire Motorsports announced Houff would drive the team's No. 77 on a part-time Monster Energy NASCAR Cup Series schedule starting at ISM Raceway. Early estimates pegged the number of races at approximately half of the 36-race schedule.

On November 27, 2019, StarCom Racing announced that Houff would drive the team's No. 00 on a full-time basis during the 2020 and 2021 seasons.

At the 2020 O'Reilly Auto Parts 500 at Texas, Houff made a last-minute decision to enter pit-road with 29 laps to go, clipping the cars of Christopher Bell and Matt DiBenedetto in the process before crashing into the outside retaining wall. He was later on criticized by DiBenedetto and Brad Keselowski, who proposed that NASCAR should add a relegation structure that would demote developmental drivers to the lower divisions should they commit a mistake similar to Houff's. Later that season, in the 2020 Yellawood 500 at Talladega Superspeedway, he finished a career high 13th place after avoiding multiple accidents on the ending laps.

Personal life
Houff works with Duke University School of Medicine's cancer programs, as his mother was treated for cancer there. His grandmother also had cancer.

Motorsports career results

NASCAR
(key) (Bold – Pole position awarded by qualifying time. Italics – Pole position earned by points standings or practice time. * – Most laps led.)

Cup Series

Daytona 500

Xfinity Series

K&N Pro Series East

 Season still in progress
 Ineligible for series points

ARCA Racing Series
(key) (Bold – Pole position awarded by qualifying time. Italics – Pole position earned by points standings or practice time. * – Most laps led.)

References

External links
  
 

1997 births
Living people
NASCAR drivers
People from Augusta County, Virginia
Racing drivers from Virginia
ARCA Menards Series drivers